Robert John Fleming (January 13, 1907 – July 14, 1984) was Governor of the Panama Canal Zone from 1962 to 1967.

Biography
Born in Fort Robinson in Nebraska on January 13, 1907 to Augusta and Robert John Fleming. He attended the United States Military Academy at West Point, graduating in 1928 before earning an M.S. in mechanical engineering from the Massachusetts Institute of Technology in 1931. He remained in the United States Army as an engineering officer until 1954, his World War II service including duty in the Pacific Theater before a series of staff posts in Washington D.C. and Virginia. After a period in public service that included a three-year sojourn in public service in France, Fleming was appointed by President John F. Kennedy as Governor of the Panama Canal Zone in 1962.

 

He retired to take up a position as Executive Vice President for a company in Boston, Massachusetts. His tenure in charge had also seen the most comprehensive survey of the canal with the intention of widening it, the inauguration of the Panama Canal Spillway newspaper and the opening of the Thatcher Ferry Bridge.

He died on the July 14, 1984.

Awards and decorations
His years of military and public service came with several awards. He was given the Legion of Merit, the Bronze Star, the Army Commendation Medal, the Order of the White Lion from Czechoslovakia, the Légion d'honneur from France and the Grand Cross Nuñez de Balboa from Panama for his various and varied public services.

External links
Panama Canal Authority biography

1907 births
1984 deaths
United States Military Academy alumni
MIT School of Engineering alumni
United States Army personnel of World War II
Governors of the Panama Canal Zone
Recipients of the Legion of Honour
Recipients of the Legion of Merit